Raymond Wilbur Fairchild (September 9, 1889 – June 12, 1956) was a college administrator. He also coached American football. He served as the president of Illinois State Normal University (now Illinois State University) from 1933 to 1955. He was previously a faculty member at the University of Wisconsin–Stevens Point, where he served as a biology instructor and head football coach.

Head coaching record

References

External links
 

1889 births
1956 deaths
Presidents of Illinois State University
University of Michigan alumni
Wisconsin–Stevens Point Pointers football coaches
People from Vermilion County, Illinois
20th-century American academics